Östhamra is a locality in Norrtälje Municipality, Stockholm County, Sweden. It is situated just to the south of the town of Norrtälje. It had 255 inhabitants in 2010.

References 

Populated places in Norrtälje Municipality